Gosling Creek Dam is a decommissioned minor earth and rock fill with clay core embankment dam with concrete chute spillway across the Gosling Creek upstream of Orange in the central western region of New South Wales, Australia. Commissioned in 1890 to supply Orange with potable water, the dam was decommissioned after the official commissioning of the Suma Park Dam in 1962. The impounded reservoir is called Gosling Creek Reservoir and is now used for recreation purposes.

Location and features
Additional dams for water supply were completed in 1918 at built at Meadow Creek Dam and then Spring Creek Reservoir in 1931.

The ungated concrete chute spillway is capable of discharging .

Gosling Creek was named after Jonathon W. Gosling, a free settler who arrived in Australia by ship in 1827 and the first property owner in the district.

Gosling Creek Reservoir is no longer used for water supply purposes, and in recent years the Orange City Council has developed the area as a recreation reserve. Facilities include a pedestrian and cycle way system, playground, bird hide, passive recreation areas. The reservoir was previously surrounded by pine plantations which have been logged and progressively replaced by native vegetation plantings.

In May, 2007 the nearby Cadia mine approached Orange City Council with a request to obtain water from Gosling Creek Reservoir for mining purposes due to their dwindling water supplies as a result of the ongoing drought.

See also

 List of dams and reservoirs in New South Wales

References

External links
 
 
 

Central West (New South Wales)
Dams completed in 1890
Dams in New South Wales
Embankment dams